Peter B. Johnson is an American politician from Maine, USA. A Republican, Johnson served in the Maine House of Representatives from 2006 and was unable to seek re-election in 2014 due to term limits. He served in the Maine Air National Guard.

References

Year of birth missing (living people)
Living people
People from Greenville, Maine
Republican Party members of the Maine House of Representatives
University of Maine alumni